is a passenger railway station located in the city of Tamano, Okayama Prefecture, Japan, operated by the West Japan Railway Company (JR West).

Lines

Station layout
The station consists of one ground-level side platform serving a single bi-directional track. There is no station building and the station is unattended.

Adjacent stations

History
Tsuneyama Station was opened on 1 January 1939. The station was closed from 1 November 1940 to 15 November 1950. With the privatization of Japanese National Railways (JNR) on 1 April 1987, the station came under the control of JR West.

Passenger statistics
In fiscal 2019, the station was used by an average of 435 passengers daily

Surrounding area
Tamano Driving School
Tsuneyama Castle ruins
Japan National Route 30

See also
List of railway stations in Japan

References

External links

 JR West Station Official Site

Railway stations in Okayama Prefecture
Uno Line
Railway stations in Japan opened in 1939
Tamano, Okayama